Adrian Peter McLaren (born 21 April 1980 in Kimberley, Northern Cape) is a South African first class cricketer who plays for Griqualand West. A right-handed batsman, McLaren was the second highest runs scorer in the SAA Provincial Challenge for 2006–07 with 807 runs at 62.07, including 4 hundreds. His cousin Ryan McLaren also plays domestic cricket in South Africa.

References
 

1980 births
Living people
South African cricketers
Griqualand West cricketers
Knights cricketers